The  is an annual Japanese literary award conducted by Tokyo Sogensha since 2010. It is a prize contest for original unpublished stories of science fiction and other related genres. It is mainly intended for amateur writers, but also open to who have professional publications.
The winning stories have been published in the year's-best Japanese SF anthology series from the publisher's imprint Sōgen SF Bunko until 2019. Since 2020, they will be included in Genesis, the publisher's hard cover SFF series.

In 2010 and 2011, some of finalist stories were collected into original anthology series .

Until 2019, Regular judges have been Nozomi Ohmori (critic/translator/anthologist) and Sanzō Kusaka (critic/anthologist), who have edited the year's-best. Another notable author have been invited as a guest judge each year.

Recognition
Yūsuke Miyauchi's first collection  was nominated for the 147th Naoki Prize and won the 2012 Nihon SF Taisho Award.

Dempow Torishima's first collection  won the 2013 Nihon SF Taisho Award. The English translation of the book, Sisyphean, was published in 2018, following that the original award-winning novella "Kaikin no To" was translated into English as "Sisyphean" and included in the English anthology Phantasm Japan. His first novel  also won the 2019 Nihon SF Taisho Award.

Winners 
English titles are for translated stories.

Published Books

References

External links
 
 

S
Japanese science fiction awards
Japanese-language literary awards
Short story awards